Nataliya Yuryevna Ignatyeva (Наталья Юрьевна Игнатьева, born 17 August 1978) is a Kazakhstani female water polo player. She was a member of the Kazakhstan women's national water polo team, playing as a driver. 

She was a part of the  team at the 2000 Summer Olympics and 2004 Summer Olympics. On club level she played for Eurasia Rakhat in Kazakhstan.

References

External links
http://www.swimmersworld.com/News/view/2433
https://www.newspapers.com/newspage/120640647/
http://www.alamy.com/stock-photo-kazakhstan-waterpolo-olympic-team-member-natalya-ignatyeva-l-shows-118556036.html

1978 births
Living people
Kazakhstani female water polo players
Water polo players at the 2004 Summer Olympics
Olympic water polo players of Kazakhstan
Sportspeople from Almaty
Water polo players at the 2000 Summer Olympics
21st-century Kazakhstani women